WDSL (1520 AM) is a radio station licensed to Mocksville, North Carolina, United States.  The station is owned by WDSL Broadcasting .  The station format is Classic Country, Bluegrass and Gospel.

References

External links

DSL
DSL